The 2012 São Paulo municipal election took place in the city of São Paulo, with the first round taking place on 7 October 2012 and the second round taking place on 28 October 2012. Voters voted to elect the Mayor, the Vice Mayor and 55 city councillors for the administration of the city. The result was a 2nd round victory for Fernando Haddad of the Workers' Party (PT), winning 3,387,720 votes and a share of 55.57% of the popular vote, defeating José Serra of the Brazilian Social Democracy Party (PSDB), who took 2,708,768 votes and a share of 44.43% of the popular vote.

Candidates

Candidates in runoff

Candidates failing to make runoff

Debates

First round

Second round

Opinion polls

First round

Second round

Results

Mayor

Municipal Chamber

References

2012
2012 elections in Brazil
October 2012 events in South America